Zorro is a 2009 Philippine television drama action series broadcast by GMA Network. The series is based on the  Zorro character created by Johnston McCulley. Directed by Mark A. Reyes and Dominic Zapata, it stars Richard Gutierrez in the title role. It premiered on March 23, 2009 on the network's Telebabad line up. The series concluded on August 7, 2009 with a total of 98 episodes. It was replaced by Darna in its timeslot.

Cast and characters

Lead cast
Richard Gutierrez as Antonio de la Cruz Pelaez / Zorro

Supporting cast
Rhian Ramos as Lolita Pulido
Jaclyn Jose as Chiquita Pelaez
Michelle Madrigal as Juana Manalo / Caballera
Bianca King as Cara
Eddie Gutierrez as Luis Aragon
TJ Trinidad as Ramon Pelaez
Joel Torre as Roberto Pelaez / Rosso
Leo Martinez as Carlos Pulido
Pinky Marquez as Catalina Pulido
Ricky Davao as Felipe Gomez
Bobby Andrews as Pedro Gonzales
Antonio Aquitania as Bernardo
Robert Villar as Pepe Alugbati
Epy Quizon as Shihong / Tahong
Sandy Andolong as Maria Manalo
Maureen Larrazabal as Bella de la Cruz

Recurring cast
Gloria Sevilla as Zita
Sheena Halili as Lena
Bubbles Paraiso as Magda
Paloma Esmeria as Paquita Pakwan
Shiela Marie Rodriguez as Lisa
Bodie Cruz  as Agustin Manalo
Elvis Gutierrez as Silverio

Guest cast
Lani Mercado as Marcela de la Cruz
Mark Gil as Horacio Pelaez
Jomari Yllana as Diego de la Vega
Jacob Rica as young Antonio
Gail Lardizabal as young Lolita
Sugar Mercado as Anna
Dante Rivero as magistrate of Angeles
Chanda Romero as Aguida 
Dick Israel as Jumal
Jen Rosendahl as Jumal's assistant
Isabel Granada as Minerva
Edwin Reyes as Tomas
Daria Ramirez as Aswang
Yul Servo as Samurai
Suzette Ranillo as Chiquita's assistant
Nonie Buencamino as De los Reyes
Richie Paul Gutierrez as Sebastian
Rocky Gutierrez as Baltazar
Alfred Vargas as Lima Wong
Felix Roco as Diego
Dominic Roco as Daniel l
Bearwin Meily as a pirate
LJ Reyes as Sandy

Ratings
According to AGB Nielsen Philippines' Mega Manila household television ratings, the pilot episode of Zorro earned a 35.8% rating. While the final episode scored a 32% rating.

References

External links
 

2009 Philippine television series debuts
2009 Philippine television series endings
Filipino-language television shows
GMA Network drama series
Philippine action television series
Zorro television series